Isonomeutis restincta, the marbled snouter, is a species of moth in the family Copromorphidae. It is endemic to New Zealand where it is likely found in the northern parts of the North Island. Not much is known of the life history of this species but it has been hypothesised that it is a scale insect predator. The adults of this species are on the wing from November to January. This species has been classified as "At Risk, Naturally Uncommon" by the Department of Conservation.

Taxonomy 
This species was first described by Edward Meyrick in 1923 using a specimen collected by George Vernon Hudson at Kaeo, north of Auckland. Hudson discussed and illustrated this species in his 1928 publication The Butterflies and Moths of New Zealand. The male holotype specimen, collected at Kaeo in Northland, is held at the Natural History Museum, London.

Description 

Meyrick described the species as follows:

Distribution 
I. restincta is endemic to New Zealand.  It occurs in the Northland, Auckland and Taupo districts and in the Pureora Forest. In 1939 Hudson also stated in occurred in Wiltons bush in Wellington however, given he mistakenly illustrated its close relative I. amauropa as I. restincta in that publication this statement is in doubt.

Biology and life history 
Very little of the life history of this species is known. The adults have been recorded as being on the wing in November, December and January.

Habitat and host species 
The host species of the larvae of I. restincta is unknown. However it has been hypothesised that it is a scale insect predator like I. amauropa.

Conservation Status 
This species has been classified as having the "At Risk, Naturally Uncommon" conservation status, with the qualifier of being range restricted, under the New Zealand Threat Classification System.

References

External links

Photo of holotype specimen

Copromorphidae
Moths of New Zealand
Endemic fauna of New Zealand
Moths described in 1923
Taxa named by Edward Meyrick
Endangered biota of New Zealand
Endemic moths of New Zealand